Hot zone may refer to:

 The Hot Zone, a 1994 non-fiction book by Richard Preston
 Hot zone (environment), a location that is considered to be dangerous

Television
 HOT Zone, an Israeli TC channel on the Hot cable service
 Combat Hospital, aka The Hot Zone, a 2011 Canadian TV series
 The Hot Zone (American TV series), 2019 TV series based on the Richard Preston book
 "Hot Zone" (Stargate Atlantis), a season 1 episode of the TV series Stargate Atlantis

Other uses
 Hot Zone, an alternative name for the Transformers character "Hot Spot"
 Hot-zone, a wireless wide area network offering internet access

See also 

 
 War zone (disambiguation)
 Hot (disambiguation)
 Zone (disambiguation)